The Pierino Ambrosoli Foundation is dedicated to Daniela Ambrosoli’s father, Pierino Ambrosoli, a successful Italian/Swiss industrialist and her mother, Sonja Bragowa, a former dancer in the 1920s.

The foundation is not due to the testamentary will of Pierino Ambrosoli. Rather, it arose by the desire of Daniela Ambrosoli, who decided to use a substantial portion of her inherited fortune from the father, to support young artists on their way to the stage. Thus, the Pierino Ambrosoli Foundation was founded on May 10, 1990 in Zurich.

Purpose
The Pierino Ambrosoli Foundation supports very young talented dancers and musicians on their way to the stage for the promotion of dance and music at a professional level through scholarships all over the world at recognized vocational institutions. Ballet school graduates can obtain a scholarship as a trainee at theatres and dance companies. The foundation collaborates with other organizations, schools and theatres. A careful investigation of the talent and the need for a scholarship is a prerequisite for the scholarship grants.

On request, the foundation offers also technical information and advice. The personal care and regular contact with the foundation's scholarship holders distinguishes the foundation's work. The Pierino Ambrosoli Foundation is member of the International Organization for the Transition of Professional Dancers. Daniela Ambrosoli has been among others member of the patronage committee of the Prix de Lausanne, the Swiss Dance Prize and she is a member of the board Montecinemaverità Foundation.

Organisation
The Pierino Ambrosoli Foundation is a private non-profit foundation. Today it consists of a board of trustees, the founder and president Daniela Ambrosoli as well as a professional advisory board for the areas of music and dance. Mrs Ruth Suter worked as General Secretary since the foundation of the Pierino Ambrosoli Foundation in 1990 until December 1996. Since 1998 Mr Michael Jürgens works as General Manager and adviser in the field of dance for the foundation.

Auditions
The Pierino Ambrosoli Foundation organizes auditions: 
 1993 Audition Pierino Ambrosoli Foundation in Zurich
 2000-2010 Swiss Audition for the Rotterdam Dance Academy, NL in Bern

Successful careers
Since the foundation some of the most successful scholarship holders of the Pierino Ambrosoli Foundation should be mentioned such as:

Classical Dance
First Soloists/Principals
 Dominic Antonucci, Principal Birmingham Royal Ballet
 Anna Laudere, Principal Hamburg Ballet John Neumeier
 David Makhateli, Principal Royal Ballet London
 Diana Martinez Morales, Principal Stuttgart Ballet
 Shintaro Oue, Principal Hamburg Ballet John Neumeier, Nederlands Dans Theater and choreographer
 Valentina Scaglia, Principal Hamburg Ballet John Neumeier, Nederlands Dans Theater
 Ivan Urban, Principal Hamburg Ballet John Neumeier
 Ilana Werner, Bavarian State Ballet

Soloists
 Sarah Kora Dayanova, Sujet Ballet de l’Opéra National de Paris
 Zaloa Fabbrini, Maggio Danza Firenze
 John Lam, Boston Ballet
 Giada Rossi, Ballet de l’Opéra National de Bordeaux
 Lucia Solari, Hamburg Ballett John Neumeier, Northern Ballet
 Ljupka Stamenovsky, National Theater Belgrad

Contemporary Dance
 Michele Mastroianni, soloist Companyia Gelabert-Azzopardi, Barcelona, dancer, choreographer and director of the Michele Mastroianni Company, Italy
 Eugénie Rébétez, free dancer and choreographer, Switzerland
 Iratxe Ansa, dancer and choreographer, Spain
 Morgan Belenguer, performer, dancer and choreographer, Berlin
 Jochen Heckmann, director and choreographer Ballett Theater Augsburg, Artistic Director HF Bühnentanz Zürich 
 Jasmine Morand, founder, dancer and choreographer company prototype-status

Companies

The Pierino Ambrosoli Foundation is supporting promising companies to promote their creations and work:

 Contemporary Dance ZH, Paula Lansley
 Teatro di Locarno, Switzerland
 EFAS, European Film Actor School, Zurich
 Nomades, Vevey
 Linga, Pully
 Jochen Heckmann, Looping, Zürich
 Metzger Zimmermann & de Perrot, Zürich
 André Desponds & Andrea Herdeg, Zürich
 Company Krassen Krastev, Lausanne
 Bern Ballet
 Lucerne Ballet

Others

 Andrea Schärli, Ballet- and dance teacher, movement scientist ETH Zurich
 Diego Lluma, International dance journalist

Music

 Illya Buyalskyy - Pianist - 1. Prize International piano competition in Paris 2008, Special Prize "For Performance and Promotion of Contemporary Music" at the 4th Intern. Competition in Santorini (Greece) 2008
 Demetre Gamsachurdia - Pianist and composer- 1. Prize and Bärenreiter special prize Swiss Youth Music Competition 2003 Kiwanis Swiss Youth Music Prize 2004, SUISA-Prize 2005, 2007 Werkjahrespreis of the canton of Solothurn, winner Swiss Youth Music Competition 2008, several prizes at various regional and national competitions
 Fulvia Mancini, International violoncello soloist, - first absolute award of the Rassegna Musicale per violoncellisti M. Benvenuti of Vittorio Veneto, second prize at the 12th Tournis international de la Musique, second prize Virtuosité at the 5th Concours international AGIMUS of Padua 
 Lisa Öberg - International violin soloist - 1. Prize international music competition Stresa, Italy, recognition “Assoluta”, National Olympiad of Music, Constanza, Rumania, 1. Prize Swiss Youth Competition, Migros-scholarship-prize, 1. Prize and special prize all categories competition Remember Enescu, Bucarest, Rumania
 Maristella Patuzzi - International violin soloist - 1998 VII. TIM, Torneo Internazionale di Musica, Rom: first prize in the category of bow instruments without age limit, 2009 scholarship Friedl Wald Foundation, Basel, 2010 first prize Francesco Geminiani, Verona, 2011/2012 Foundation for young music talents, Meggen, Absolute Prize Nuovi orizzonti 2011, Arezzo, Absolute Prize Premio Rovere d’oro a San Bartolomeo al mare. 
 Mattia Zappa - International violoncello soloist – European music fellowship for "artistic talent and outstanding accomplishment" with his interpretation of Tchaikowsky's Rococo Variations, Premio Vittorio Gui (Florenz), G.B. Viotti (Vercelli), Concorso Città di Pinerolo (Turin), Concorso Trio di Trieste, since 2000 member of the Tonhalle Orchestra Zürich

Film

 Szolt Bayer - International film actor
 Sabina Schneebeli - International film actress/Swiss Film prize 2006

Competitions

The Pierino Ambrosoli Foundation is active in the field of dance competitions:

 Concorso Giovanissimi Talenti/International Competition of Young Dancers, Turin, Italy, 1998
 International Ballet Competition Solothurn, 1999
 Prix de Lausanne, Prix Meilleurs Suisse, Switzerland, 1991–2002
 Prix de Lausanne, Prix Espoir, Switzerland, 2000
 Dance Machine Festival, Milano, 2010 and 2011

Performances

The Pierino Ambrosoli Foundation is organizing and supporting performances in the field of dance and music:

 Young Artists Meet Young Artists, Zurich, 1997
 Candlelight Concert on the Water, Maristella & Mario Patuzzi, Camping Delta, Locarno, 2000
 Benefit Gala for the International Committee for the Dignity of Children in cooperation with Soroptimist Union Switzerland, Camping Delta, Locarno, 2001
 Midsummer Night Concert, Daria & Mattia Zappa, Camping Delta, 2001
 Festival Concerti in San Martino, Ronco/ Ascona, Switzerland, 2003
 Königsfelder Festspiel: Königin von Saba, Klosterkirche Königsfelden, 2004
 Eppur Si Scende von Jasmine Morand, Theater Les Halles, Sitten/Sierre Wallis, 2004
 Cruda Bellezza, dance theatre by Teatrodanza Tiziana Arnaboldi, Chiasso, Lugano, Verscio, Switzerland, 2005
 Marvin by Jasmine Morand, Theater Rigiblick Zurich, 2005
 Perdutamente Novecento by Toni Candeloro, Untitled by Lucinda Childs, Museo di Arte Moderna e Contemporanea, Rovereto, Italy, 2006	
 15 years of Pierino Ambrosoli Foundation, Theater Rigiblick, Zürich, 2005
 Dieci by Mi Jung, IV Festival Internazionale La Donna Crea/Teatro Del Gatto, Ascona, 2006
 Theater Rigiblick, ZAL- A tribute to Frédéric Chopin by Desponds & Herdeg, Zürich, 2006
 18 years of Pierino Ambrosoli Foundation, Theater Rigiblick, Zürich, 2008

Symposium

The Pierino Ambrosoli Foundation was participating and supporting the International Organization for the Transition of Professional Dancers:

 1995 First International Symposium Lausanne, Switzerland (May 5–7, 1995) - The Dancer in Transition: Facing the limits, the realities and solutions.
 1998 Second International Symposium The Hague, Netherlands (February 6–8, 1998) - The Dancer of the XXI Century, Education for Transition in a Changing World.
 1999 International dance conference Not Just Any Body, Toronto/ Den Haag

Exhibition
The Pierino Ambrosoli Foundation is active in supporting exhibitions related to dance to promote dance in the public:
 I palcoscenici dell’ avanguardia, Museo di Arte Moderna e Contemporanea, Rovereto, Italy, 2005/06

Awards
 2008 Doron Foundation support prize, Zug

References

External links 
 Pierino Ambrosoli Foundation
 International Organization for the Transition of Professional Dancers
 Prix de Lausanne
 Official website about Pierino Ambrosoli (father)

Foundations based in Switzerland
Dance education organizations
Music education organizations
Music organisations based in Switzerland